Seth Ward may refer to:

 Seth Ward, Texas, an unincorporated community
Jimmy Dean (1928–2010), entertainer, mistakenly identified with the birth name of Seth Ward, which was actually the above town in Texas where he grew up
 Seth Ward (bishop of Salisbury) (1617–1689), English astronomer and mathematician, and the Bishop of Exeter
Seth Ward (priest) (1645–1690), English clergyman, Archdeacon of Wilts
Seth Ward (businessman) (1820–1903), parlayed an Oregon Trail supply business into large Kansas City real estate holdings including the Country Club Plaza and for whom Ward Parkway is named
 Seth Ward (Methodist bishop) (1858–1909), American bishop of the Methodist Episcopal Church, South
 Seth Ward (Whitewater), Arkansas businessman

Ward, Seth